Stan Maas (born 14 February 2001) is a Dutch professional footballer who plays as a left-back for FC Den Bosch.

Career
From Liempde, Maas He went through the entire youth academy of FC Den Bosch after joining in 2010. Capable of playing at left-back or centre-back, Mass made his senior debut as a substitute on November 15, 2020 in a 3-0 defeat away at Go Ahead Eagles. A week later on 22 November 2020, at home against Jong Ajax, he was named in the starting line-up for the first time. 

At the end of the 2021-22 season Maas signed a new two-year professional contract with Den Bosch. On 18 October, 2022, Maas scored his first goal in professional football. In the KNVB Cup game away at GVVV, he made it 3-1 in the 77th minute.

References

External links

2001 births
Living people
Dutch footballers
FC Den Bosch players 
Eerste Divisie players